Tom Rosenthal (born 3 September 1996) is an Israeli footballer who most recently played for  Belgian First Division B side Tubize. He is a midfielder and previously played for Watford F.C., Zulte-Waregem and Queens Park Rangers.

Career
Born in London, Rosenthal was in the youth system of English club Watford from the age of 10. His father, 60-cap Israel international Ronny Rosenthal, finished his career in 1999 after two seasons at the club, following seven years playing in the English top flight. Between the ages of 13 and 15 Rosenthal had problems following a growth spurt. He started a two-year scholarship at the start of the 2013–14 season and travelled with the first-team for their FA Cup fixture with Bristol City in January 2014.

On 1 September 2014 Watford announced Rosenthal had moved for an undisclosed fee to Belgian Pro League side S.V. Zulte Waregem in order for him to be closer to an ill family member, signing a two-year professional contract. However, his brother and agent Dean subsequently announced that the main reason Rosenthal had left was due to the prospect of first-team football.

He made his first team debut with S.V. Zulte Waregem on 21 January 2015 in the Belgian Cup in a 4–2 away defeat against R.S.C. Anderlecht. He played 58 minutes, before being substituted off for Ghislain Gimbert.

On 11 August 2017 Rosenthal signed for Eerste Divisie side FC Dordrecht on a one-year contract.

International career
A former youth international for Belgium, Rosenthal debuted for the Israel national under-21 football team in a 3–0 2019 UEFA European Under-21 Championship qualification loss to the Germany U21s on 22 March 2018.

References

External links
 
 
 

1996 births
Living people
Footballers from Greater London
People with acquired Israeli citizenship
Israeli footballers
Israel youth international footballers
Belgian footballers
Belgium youth international footballers
English footballers
Belgian Pro League players
Challenger Pro League players
Watford F.C. players
S.V. Zulte Waregem players
FC Dordrecht players
A.F.C. Tubize players
Eerste Divisie players
Israeli people of Belgian descent
Israeli people of Romanian-Jewish descent
Belgian people of Israeli descent
Belgian people of Romanian-Jewish descent
English people of Belgian descent
English people of Israeli descent
English people of Romanian-Jewish descent
Association football midfielders